The King William Historic District of San Antonio, Texas was listed on the National Register of Historic Places listings in Bexar County, Texas on January 20, 1972. The area was originally used as farm acreage by the Spanish priests of the Misión San Antonio de Valero, and eventually parceled off for the local indigenous peoples of the area. In addition to residential homes, the district also includes the King William Park and Bandstand originally built in 1892 on the arsenal grounds, and later moved to its current location. Other features are the Upper Mill Park, the King William River Walk, and the Johnson Street pedestrian bridge.

The subdividing of the area into residential lots dates to 1853–66, coincided with the German diaspora in Texas. San Antonio by then was experiencing an influx of German immigrants, fueled in part by the German Adelsverein colonization efforts of the mid-19th century. Wilhelm Thielepape was one of those colonists, and served as Mayor of San Antonio 1867–1872. Surveyor Ernst Hermann Altgelt relocated to San Antonio in 1866, and built the first home in the area now known as the King William District. Being the first home builder in the area, he named it after King of Prussia William I, German Emperor.  What eventually became a German enclave of the King William Historic District continued into the next generations. The 419 King William house was built in 1884 by Smith Ellis, but eventually sold to Otto Meusebach, the son of John O. Meusebach who led the Adelsverein colonization and founded the German town of Fredericksburg, Texas.

The King William Historic District evolved into more of an area for the financially successful, rather than any particular ethnicity. Louis Bergstrom was a successful businessman from Sweden. Several of the homes were designed by British architect Alfred Giles: the Carl Wilhelm August Groos House, the Edward Steves Homestead; Sartor House for jeweler Alexander Sartor Jr. Giles designed the Oge House for business leader and former Texas Ranger Louis Oge. The area was home to the United States Arsenal beginning in 1859. In 1985, the H-E-Butt grocery chain acquired ten acres for their corporation headquarters.

Property listings

52 properties (or 53 if Ball houses counted separately)

See also
National Register of Historic Places listings in Bexar County, Texas

Bibliography

References

External links
The San Antonio House Registry
Chabot House Historic Texas Landmark in the King William Historic District, but not listed on the NRHP.

Historic American Landscapes Survey in Texas
Buildings and structures in Bexar County, Texas
National Register of Historic Places in Bexar County, Texas